Medina Township is one of the seventeen  townships of Medina County, Ohio, United States.  The 2010 census found 8,537 people in the township.

Geography
Located in the central part of the county, it borders the following townships:
Brunswick Hills Township - north
Hinckley Township - northeast corner
Granger Township - east
Sharon Township - southeast corner
Montville Township - south
Lafayette Township - southwest corner
York Township - west
Liverpool Township - northwest corner

The City of Medina, the County seat, borders the Township to the southwest.

Name and history
The township derives its name from Medina, in Arabia. The original name for the Township was to be Mecca, but was changed after a dispute among early settlers. It is the only Medina Township statewide. The Township is attributed as being the oldest organized government in Medina County. Land from the Township was given to create the City of Medina in 1818.

Business and Community 
Medina Township is home to over 480 businesses that operate within the township. These businesses range from construction companies to law firms and fast food. These businesses help build a bustling economy. While it is often stated the Township is a "Bedroom Community", since 2007, more than 125 new businesses have opened their doors within the Township.

The Township has multiple community areas including Blakeslee Sports Complex, two cemeteries, and plans to build a community park. Among that the Township was one of the Top 100 Safest Communities in Ohio according to SafeWise. The community is also home to the Masonic Community which houses senior citizens and hosts numerous social events.

Government
The township is governed by a three-member board of trustees, who are elected in November of odd-numbered years to a four-year term beginning on the following January 1. Two are elected in the year after the presidential election and one is elected in the year before it. There is also an elected township fiscal officer, who serves a four-year term beginning on April 1 of the year after the election, which is held in November of the year before the presidential election. Vacancies in the fiscal officership or on the board of trustees are filled by the remaining trustees.

The Township employs its own police force and contracts with the City of Medina for Fire and EMS services. The Township is also in charge of maintaining and operating four cemeteries. These cemeteries are: Weymouth, Hamilton Corners, Remsen, and Medina Center Cemetery. The only operational cemetery is Medina Center Cemetery.

References

External links
Township website
County website

Townships in Medina County, Ohio
Townships in Ohio